Kniep is a surname. Notable people with the surname include:

Christoph Heinrich Kniep (1755–1825), German painter
Giselle O. Martin-Kniep (1956–2021), American educator, researcher, program evaluator, and writer
Hans Kniep (1881–1930), German botanist